Aditya Agarwal (born 30 May 1982) is a software engineer and customer executive . Agarwal was an early engineer at Facebook where he wrote the Facebook Search Engine. He was also Facebook's first Director of Product Engineering. He started Cove, a modern collaboration software company. Agarwal is also on the board of Flipkart.

Early life and education 

Agarwal was born in India. His father was a chemical engineer and his mother was a homemaker. Agarwal moved with his family to many countries: Cameroon, Singapore, Malaysia, Indonesia and Thailand, and eventually settled in the United States. He was interested in computers and programming since a young age, and took programming classes while in Indonesia.

After completing high school, Agarwal went to Carnegie Mellon University to pursue computer science. Agarwal obtained a Bachelor's and master's degree in Computer Science. Agarwal's post-graduate research focused on automatic clustering and segmentation of email corpora.

Career

Facebook 

After graduating CMU in 2004, Agarwal saw many of his classmates move to Wall Street (the financial sector), but he wanted to enter the technology sector, so he began work at Oracle Inc in the San Francisco Bay Area. In 2005, he met Mark Zuckerberg after being introduced by a mutual acquaintance. Zuckerberg, who had started Facebook in 2004, impressed Agarwal, leading Agarwal to begin work at Facebook. Agarwal also persuaded his former CMU colleague and future wife Ruchi Sanghvi to work at Facebook.

Agarwal and Sanghvi worked at Facebook till 2010.

Cove and Dropbox 

After leaving Facebook, Agarwal and his wife Ruchi Sanghvi, co-founded Cove, a stealth collaboration startup. In February 2012, it was announced that Dropbox was acquiring Cove, and that both Agarwal and Sanghvi were joining Dropbox.
In October 2016, Agarwal was promoted from vice-president of engineering to chief technology officer (CTO), replacing co-founder Arash Ferdowsi.

In July 2017, Agarwal announced in a Facebook post that he was leaving Dropbox, while expressing excitement about its trajectory.

South Park Commons Fund and Iconiq 

Agarwal is a partner at South Park Commons Fund, an early-stage venture firm. He is also a partner at ICONIQ Capital, a growth stage venture firm.

Other 

In 2019, Agarwal announced that he is a senior advisor and Chair of the Technology Committee for the upcoming 2022 Fifa Football World Cup in Qatar.

Agarwal recently published a book on Technical Hiring and Recruiting.

Board Memberships

Philanthropy 

Agarwal was listed as one of the founders of FWD.us, a 501(c)(4) lobbying group formed in Silicon Valley to promote immigration reform, improve education, and facilitate technological breakthroughs in the United States.24 The group launched on 11 April 2013.25

He was also on the board of the Anita Borg Institute, the leading organization advocating for gender equality in the technology workforce.

He also serves on the advisory board of the School of Computer Science at Carnegie Mellon University.

Personal life 

Agarwal is married to engineer Ruchi Sanghvi, who was also his co-worker at Facebook and Dropbox and co-founder with him of Cove (which was acquired by Dropbox). The couple married in 2010 in India, with Mark Zuckerberg attending the wedding.

See also 
 Ruchi Sanghvi

References 

21st-century Indian engineers
Living people
Computer engineers
Facebook employees
1982 births